Young Irelands are a Gaelic Athletic Association Club based in Gowran, County Kilkenny, Ireland. Formed in 1952, they are located on the Chapel Road just outside the village. Their jersey consists of red and white vertical stripes.

They are currently managed by Alan Roche. Past managers have included Pat O'Neill and Kevin Fennelly.

Honours
Young Irelands GAA Club has been Kilkenny Senior Hurling Championship winner on two occasions, 1996 and 2002.
It was also a finalist in 1997, 2003 and 2004. It was also Leinster Senior Club Hurling Championship Finalist in 2002, losing to Birr in Portlaoise

 Kilkenny Senior Hurling Championships: (2) 1996, 2002
 Leinster Senior Club Hurling Championships: Runner-Up 2002-03
 Kilkenny Intermediate Hurling Championships: (1) 1992
 Kilkenny Junior Hurling Championships: (1) 1964
 Kilkenny Minor Hurling Championships: (1) 1988

All Stars
D. J. Carey:
1991, 1992, 1993, 1994, 1995, 1997, 1999, 2000, 2002.
Charlie Carter
1998, 2000, 2001.
Pat O'Neill
1993

References

External links
Young Irelands on Kilkenny Cats.

Gaelic games clubs in County Kilkenny
Hurling clubs in County Kilkenny